Peter Brennan (1786 – August 13, 1887) was an Irish-born political figure in Newfoundland. He represented St. John's West in the Newfoundland Assembly from 1866 to 1873.

He was born in County Kilkenny and came to St. John's in 1819, where he worked for a time as a bonesetter. He was first elected to the assembly in an 1866 by-election. Brennan died in St. John's in 1887.

References 
 

Members of the Newfoundland and Labrador House of Assembly
1786 births
1887 deaths
Newfoundland Colony people
Irish emigrants to pre-Confederation Newfoundland